Adama is a 2015 French animated drama film directed by Simon Rouby. It tells the story of a young West African boy who sets off across Europe in search of his older brother during the First World War. It premiered at the Annecy International Animated Film Festival in June 2015.

Voice cast 
 Azize Diabaté Abdoulaye as Adama 
 Pascal N'Zonzi as Abdou
 Oxmo Puccino as Djo 
 Jack Mba as Samba

Accolades

References

External links 
 

2015 animated films
2015 films
Films set in Africa
Films set in France
2010s French animated films
French animated films
2010s French-language films
2015 directorial debut films
French World War I films
2010s French films